was a village located in Senboku District, Akita Prefecture, Japan.

As of 2003, the village had an estimated population of 8,050 and a density of 195.58 persons per km². The total area was 41.16 km².

On November 1, 2004, Sennan, along with the towns of Rokugō and Senhata (all from Senboku District), merged to create the town of Misato.

External links
 Official website of Misato 

Dissolved municipalities of Akita Prefecture